The UEFA Futsal Euro 2012 was the eighth official edition of the UEFA European Championship for national futsal teams. It was hosted by Croatia, and was played from January, 31 to February, 11. 12 teams competed for the title, with 11 teams gain entries from qualification rounds, while Croatia gained an automatic entry as hosts. The championship was played in the two biggest Croatian cities, Zagreb and the 15,024 seater Arena Zagreb and in Split, at the 10,931 capacity Spaladium Arena.

Spain defended their title, having won it for the sixth consecutive time.

Bids
Three nations had made bids for the 2012 Championship. Alongside Croatia, Belgium – which had failed in the 2010 bid – made a new bid with Antwerp and Charleroi, while Macedonia made one with the city of Skopje. Croatia was selected to host the Championship by a decision made on 24 March 2010, at the UEFA Executive Committee meeting in Tel Aviv, Israel.

Squads

Venues

Qualification

Forty-two nations took part in 2012 edition. Host nation qualified directly, while other had to go through qualification rounds.

The qualification was played in two stages, with 24 sides competing in the preliminary round between 20–24 January 2011. The group winners progressed to join the other 18 entrants in the next phase. In the main qualifying round, which was taking place between 24–27 February 2011, 24 teams were split in 6 groups of 4 teams. The winners and best five second-placed teams joined Croatia in the finals.

Qualified teams

Seeding
UEFA announced the seedings on Monday, 28 February 2011, one day after the qualification was concluded. Croatia was automatically seeded as A1. The  Draw was scheduled for 9 September 2011 in the Croatian capital Zagreb.

Referees

Group stage

Group A

Group B

Group C

Group D

Knockout stage

Quarter-finals

Semi-finals

Third place match

Final

Final ranking

References

External links
 
 Official UEFA website

 
2012
2012
UEFA
UEFA
Sport in Split, Croatia
Sports competitions in Zagreb
2010s in Zagreb
January 2012 sports events in Europe
February 2012 sports events in Europe